Buzara latizona  is a moth of the family Erebidae. It is found in New Guinea and the northern half of Australia.

The wingspan is about 40 mm.

The larvae feed on Phyllanthus species.

References

External links
Australian Caterpillars

Calpinae
Moths described in 1874